Silanes refers to diverse organosilicon charge-neutral compounds with the formula .  The R substituents can any combination of organic  or inorganic groups.  Most silanes contain Si-C bonds, and are discussed under organosilicon compounds.  Some contain Si-H bonds and are discussed under hydrosilanes.

Examples 
Silane , the parent.
Binary silicon-hydrogen compounds (which are sometimes called silanes also) includes silane itself but also compounds with Si-Si bonds including disilane and longer chains.
Silanes with one, two, three, or four Si-H bonds are called hydrosilanes. Silane is again the parent member. Examples: triethylsilane and triethoxysilane.
Polysilanes are organosilicon compounds with the formula . They feature Si-Si bonds. Attracting more interest are the organic derivatives such as polydimethylsilane . Dodecamethylcyclohexasilane  is an oligomer of such materials. Formally speaking, polysilanes also include compounds of the type , but these less studied. 
Chlorosilanes have Si-Cl bonds. The dominant examples come from the Direct process, i.e., (CH3)4-xSiClx.  Another important member is trichlorosilane.
Organosilanes are a class of charge-neutral organosilicon compounds. Example: tetramethylsilane

By tradition, compounds with Si-O-Si bonds are usually not referred to as silanes.  Instead, they are called siloxanes.  One example is hexamethyldisiloxane, .

See also

References

Silanes
Trimethylsilyl compounds
Carbosilanes